Simcad Pro simulation software is a product of CreateASoft Inc. used for simulating process-based environments including manufacturing, warehousing, supply lines, logistics, and healthcare. It is a tool used for planning, organizing, optimizing, and engineering real process-based systems. Simcad Pro allows the creation of a virtual computer model, which can be manipulated by the user and represents a real environment. Using the model, it is possible to test for efficiency as well as locate points of improvement among the process flow. Simcad Pro's dynamic computer model also allows for changes to occur while the model is running for a fully realistic simulation. It can also be integrated with live and historical data.

Simulation software is part of a broader category of Industry 4.0 technologies, or technologies that move organizations to digitization of operations.

Model Building

User Interface 
Simcad Pro has a user-friendly graphical user interface for building virtual models of process-based environments, and the entire model can be built and edited without coding, including any advanced model characteristics. In addition to this, Simcad Pro allows for data import from almost any data source, including Microsoft Access, Excel, Visio, and SQL Server databases for easier model creation. Simcad Pro also supports real-time tracking using devices including RFID tags and barcode scanners. Simulations can then be viewed in either 2D or 3D.

Simulation Engine 
Simcad Pro uses a patented simulation engine that is 64-bit and fully multi-threaded, distinguishing it from the SIMAN simulation engine used in many competing software products. Models built with the Simcad engine feature patented "On-The-Fly" simulation, meaning that models can be manipulated, edited, and transformed as they are performing a simulation run.

Applied Industries 
Any industry engaged in a process-flow environment can use Simcad Pro to model their operations. The main industries where Simcad Pro is used are manufacturing, warehousing, supply chain & logistics, and healthcare.

Manufacturing 
Simcad Pro can be used to simulate manufacturing operations, with the most common goals being to:

 Optimize production schedules
 Optimize labor allocation
 Perform capacity analysis and growth projection
 Manage and reduce WIP 
 Identify bottlenecks and constraints
 Optimize facility layout

Simcad Pro supports high-mix manufacturing operations with the ability to model:

 Detailed part routing
 Multiple sub-assemblies/components and detailed BOM support
 Tooling and manpower constraints
 Work orders, detailed cell implementation and sequencing
 Kanban pull and material handling

Warehousing 
Simcad Pro can be used to simulate warehouses and distribution centers, with the most common goals being to:

 Optimize pick paths
 Perform congestion analysis
 Optimize staging areas
 Analyze receiving and put-away operations
 Optimize slotting
 Validate and implement automation
 Analyze storage media

Supply Chain & Logistics 
Simcad Pro can be used to simulate supply chains and logistics operations, with the most common goals being to:

 Manage inventory and delivery to ensure product availability
 Determine optimal locations for distribution centers
 Determine impact of changes to supply and demand
 Reduce transportation costs
 Optimize delivery routes
 Plan capacity and scheduling changes
 Reduce delivery lead time

Healthcare 
Simcad Pro can be used to simulate healthcare operations, such as emergency rooms and operating rooms, with the most common goals being to:

 Optimize patient flow and reduce patient wait times
 Optimize bed allocation
 Analyze length-of-stay
 Optimize staff utilization and scheduling 
 Optimize ED capacity planning
 Optimize OR department scheduling & efficiency

Version History

See also
 List of discrete event simulation software
 Discrete event simulation
 List of computer simulation software
 Simulation in manufacturing systems

References

External links
 Createasoft website
 Simcad Pro simulation software
 Simcad Pro Healthcare simulation software
 SimTrack predictive analytics software
 SimTrack healthcare predictive analytics software
 smaRTLS Real-time locating system
 SimData Time and motion studies software
 ianimate3D 3D animation software

Simulation software
Companies based in Chicago